Diaulula phoca is a species of sea slug or dorid nudibranch, a marine gastropod mollusc in the family Discodorididae.

Taxonomy
This species was originally described under the name Discodoris phoca by Eveline Du Bois-Reymond Marcus and Ernst Gustav Gotthelf Marcus in 1967. It is considered a member of Diaulula because of the presence of caryophyllidia.

Distribution
Distribution of Diaulula phoca includes Florida, Honduras, Costa Rica, Brazil and Panama.

The type locality is west side of the Key Biscayne island, Florida. The holotype is stored in the National Museum of Natural History, Smithsonian Institution.

Description
The body is oval. Mantle is rigid. Dorsum is covered with small caryophyllidia. Body, rhinophores, and gill are dark purplish brown with numerous small opaque white dots. It is up to 55 mm long.

Ecology
It feeds on sponges.

References
This article incorporates Creative Commons (CC-BY-4.0) text from the reference

External links

Discodorididae
Gastropods described in 1967
Taxa named by Eveline Du Bois-Reymond Marcus
Taxa named by Ernst Marcus (zoologist)